Southwind High School (SHS) is a public high school located in unincorporated Shelby County, Tennessee, United States, and is operated by the Shelby County Schools district, and is located southeast of Memphis.

In 2010, its student body was 94% black, while Collierville High School, 10 miles away, had a student body that was 82% white. The high school which is located within the Southwind gated community was established in 2007.

Notes 
Principal- John Bush

2012-2013 TSSAA Basketball State Champions

School incident 
On August 9, 2022, a student was in an altercation with a security guard, due to the violation of a school dress code. Because of this, three security guards slammed the student down to the ground. However, the student was wearing sandals, and it was also caught on video by another student.

Notable alumni
Jarnell Stokes, former basketball player for the University of Tennessee and the NBA's Memphis Grizzlies who now plays for the Xinjiang Flying Tigers of the Chinese Basketball Association.

References

External links

 Southwind High School

Public high schools in Tennessee

Schools in Shelby County, Tennessee